Two Billion Hearts is the official documentary film of the 1994 FIFA World Cup held in the United States.

The American version of the film is narrated by Liev Schreiber and tells the story of the 1994 FIFA World Cup which was won by Brazil who beat Italy in the final.

References

External links

 

1990s English-language films
1990s Portuguese-language films
1994 FIFA World Cup
1995 documentary films
1995 films
Documentary films about association football
FIFA World Cup official films